Theodore D. Wachs (born February 6, 1941) is an American psychologist and professor in the Department of Psychological Sciences at Purdue University. He has studied the effects of environmental factors, such as noise, on children's mental development. He has also conducted research in the field of behavioral genetics. Wachs was one of the founders of the Global Child Development Group in 2007.

References

1941 births
Living people
People from Brooklyn
Purdue University faculty
21st-century American psychologists
Muhlenberg College alumni
Peabody College alumni
American developmental psychologists
Behavior geneticists
20th-century American psychologists